

Carappee Hill Conservation Park is a protected area in the Australian state of South Australia located on the Eyre Peninsula in the gazetted locality of Darke Peak about  north-east of the town centre in Darke Peak.

The conservation park was proclaimed on 30 August 1973 under the state's National Parks and Wildlife Act 1972 in respect to land in section 104 in the cadastral unit of the Hundred of Pascoe which had been dedicated as a water conservation reserve since 1955.

The conservation park is classified as an IUCN Category III protected area.

See also
Protected areas of South Australia

References

External links
Entry for Carappee Hill Conservation Park on the Protected Planet website

Conservation parks of South Australia
Protected areas established in 1973
1973 establishments in Australia
Eyre Peninsula